Vladimir Alexandrovich  Grammatikov (born 1 June 1942) is a Russian and Soviet theater and film actor, director, screenwriter and producer. Honored Artist of the Russian Federation (1995).

Biography 
Vladimir Grammatikov was born 1 June 1942 in Sverdlovsk. He graduated from the construction faculty of radio Bauman College in Moscow, and then decided to link his lives with cinematography. Later, he got an education at the acting department Russian Academy of Theatre Arts, becoming an actor pantomime.

In 1976 he graduated from the Directing Department of Gerasimov Institute of Cinematography (class of Efim Dzigan).

From 1976 – actor and director Gorky Film Studio. Directed sketches for the newsreel Yeralash and commercials.

Since 1990 – artistic director of the creative association Contact (Gorky Film Studio). One of the founders and artistic director of the studio Starlight  (Russia, Sweden, the United Kingdom, Denmark). President of the  Starlight-fest  – International Children's Film Festival in Artek (1992–1996). One of the founders of the Festival of Visual Arts at the Russian Children's Center  Eaglet  (1997–2006).

He was the chief director and artistic director of the children's series for preschoolers,  Sesame Street in Russia (NTV).

In March 2010, Vladimir Grammatikov appointed as creative producer for Disney in Russia.

His first full-length work as a director – a children's comedy film Mustached Nanny  – leader in film distribution (53 million viewers). Grammatikov found himself a niche in children's and teen movies, and virtually all subsequent work of the director in the genre of family movies and won prizes at Soviet and international film festivals. One of his most famous films afterwards was the international film project Mio in the Land of Faraway (1987).

Selected filmography

Actor
Belorussian Station (1971) as Grisha
As Ilf and Petrov rode a tram (1972) as Ussishkin
Train Stop — Two Minutes (1972) as malinger
The Sixth (1981) as Pavlik
Crazy Day of Engineer Barkasov (1983) as radio center director
The Russian Singer (1993) as Nikolai Kleiman
 A Little Princess (1997)  as antiquarian

Director
 Mustached Nanny (1977)
 A Dog walked along the Piano (1978)
 Everything's the Wrong Way (1981)
 The Star and Death of Joaquin Murieta (1982)
 Mio in the Land of Faraway (1987)
 The Sisters Liberty (1990)
 A Little Princess (1997)

Producer
Come Look at Me (2001)

References

External links

1942 births
Living people
Mass media people from Yekaterinburg
Soviet male film actors
Russian male film actors
Soviet film directors
Russian film directors
Gerasimov Institute of Cinematography alumni
20th-century Russian male actors
21st-century Russian male actors
Academic staff of High Courses for Scriptwriters and Film Directors
Disney executives
Actors from Yekaterinburg